Wilbur Kingsbury Miller (October 9, 1892 – January 24, 1976) was a United States circuit judge of the United States Court of Appeals for the District of Columbia Circuit.

Education and career

Born in Owensboro, Kentucky, Miller attended the University of Michigan and read law in 1916. He entered private practice of law in Owensboro from 1916 to 1918. He was in the United States Army in 1918. He returned to private practice in Owensboro from 1918 to 1945. He was county attorney of Daviess County, Kentucky from 1921 to 1929. He was a member of the Public Service Commission of Kentucky from 1934 to 1935. He was a Judge of the Special Court of Appeals of Kentucky from 1940 to 1941.

Federal judicial service

Miller was nominated by President Harry S. Truman on September 12, 1945, to an Associate Justice seat on the United States Court of Appeals for the District of Columbia (United States Circuit Judge of the United States Court of Appeals for the District of Columbia Circuit from June 25, 1948) vacated by Associate Justice Fred M. Vinson. He was confirmed by the United States Senate on September 24, 1945, and received his commission on September 28, 1945. He served as Chief Judge from 1960 to 1962. He was a member of the Judicial Conference of the United States from 1961 to 1962. He assumed senior status on October 15, 1964. His service was terminated on January 24, 1976, due to his death.

References

Sources
 

Judges of the United States Court of Appeals for the D.C. Circuit
United States court of appeals judges appointed by Harry S. Truman
20th-century American judges
Kentucky state court judges
Kentucky lawyers
1892 births
1976 deaths
People from Owensboro, Kentucky
University of Michigan alumni